Cymatodera vandykei is a species of checkered beetles in the family Cleridae. It is found in North America.

References

 Burke, Alan F., John M. Leavengood Jr., and Gregory Zolnerowich (2015). "A checklist of the New World species of Tillinae (Coleoptera: Cleridae), with an illustrated key to genera and new country records".
 Corporaal, J. B. / Hincks, W. D., ed. (1950). Coleopterorum Catalogus Supplementa, Pars 23: (Editio Secunda) Cleridae, 373.
 Wolcott, Albert B. (1947). "Catalogue of North American beetles of the family Cleridae". Fieldiana: Zoology, vol. 32, no. 2, 61–105.

Further reading

 Arnett, R. H. Jr., M. C. Thomas, P. E. Skelley and J. H. Frank. (eds.). (21 June 2002). American Beetles, Volume II: Polyphaga: Scarabaeoidea through Curculionoidea. CRC Press LLC, Boca Raton, Florida .
 Arnett, Ross H. (2000). American Insects: A Handbook of the Insects of America North of Mexico. CRC Press.
 Richard E. White. (1983). Peterson Field Guides: Beetles. Houghton Mifflin Company.

Tillinae
Beetles described in 1904